The 1st Silvester Tournament was the inaugural edition of the Silvester Tournament, a women's ski jumping competition inspired by the Four Hills Tournament and part of the 2021–22 World Cup season.

Tournament

Rules
Just like the men's Four Hills Tournament, the competition was based on a knockout system with 50 contestants divided into 25 pairs. The top 30 advanced to the final round, which consisted of 25 winners and the top 5 lucky losers.

Schedule

Prize money
The overall winner, Marita Kramer, received 10,000 CHF and the Golden Owl Trophy.

Results

Ljubno 1
 Savina Ski Jumping Center HS94
31 December 2021

Ljubno 2
 Savina Ski Jumping Center HS94
1 January 2022 (second competition)

Overall standings
The final standings after both events:

References

External links 
 

2021 in ski jumping
2022 in ski jumping
2021 in Slovenian sport
2022 in Slovenian sport
December 2021 sports events in Europe
January 2022 sports events in Europe